is a Japanese TV personality and fashion model.

Biography
Tsubaki registered at Aoyama Gakuin University while presenting as a male, but left in the second year to work at a transsexual bar in Kabukichō, Tokyo.

In July 2006, she underwent gender confirmation surgery in Phuket, Thailand, and in December 2006, officially changed her registered gender from male to female in her koseki (family registry). She resumed studies at Aoyama Gakuin University in April 2007.

Tsubaki also works as a fashion model for the Koakuma Ageha girls' fashion magazine.

TV appearances
  (Tokyo Broadcasting System)
  (TV Asahi, 2009)

Works

Books
  (June 2008)
 C'est ma vie, photo book (October 2008)
 Tsubaki izen (椿姫以前, Before Tsubaki) (January 2009)

References

External links
 Official blog 
 

Japanese television personalities
Japanese female models
Japanese transgender people
Aoyama Gakuin University alumni
People from Tokyo
1984 births
Living people
Transgender female models
21st-century Japanese LGBT people